Chuncheon (formerly romanized as Chunchŏn; literally spring river) is the capital of Gangwon Province in South Korea. The city lies in the north of the county, located in a basin formed by the Soyang River and Han River. There are some large lakes around the city, most notably Soyang Lake and Uiam Lake (or Uiam Dam). The area is renowned for its small river islands, such as Sangjungdo, Ha-Jungdo, Bungeodo, and Wido.

It is a popular destination among east Asian tourists as it was featured in the popular Korean drama Winter Sonata (겨울연가). It is where the resort island of Namiseom is located.

History

The area now occupied by the city was first settled several thousands of years ago, in prehistoric times, as demonstrated by stone-age archaeological evidence in the collections of Chuncheon National Museum and Hallym University Museum.  In 637 AD the city was called Usooju. In 757 AD it was renamed Saku and again in 940 AD as Chunju before receiving its current name in 1413. In 1896, Chuncheon became the capital city of Gangwon province. The city was largely destroyed during the Korean War in the Battle of Chuncheon.

Uiam Dam on the Bukhan River was completed in 1967. In 1995 Chuncheon city was merged with the government of the surrounding Chuncheon county.

Culture
In the spring, the Chuncheon International Mime Festival is held, as well as the Spring Season Art Festival. In the summer, the Chuncheon Puppet Festival takes place. There is also a Makguksu festival; a cold noodle dish that originated in Chuncheon. Also celebrated in the summer is the International Animation Festival. The city has had its own annual marathon race since 1946; the Chuncheon Marathon is held every October. In winter, snow and ice festivals are organized. Currently, MAC Architects-Consultants Group Ltd. is building the Design and Arts Arcadia of Myungseung in Chuncheon.

According to the legend surrounding Cheongpyeongsa temple in Chuncheon-si, a man loved a princess so much that he became a snake and would not leave her alone. When she begged leave to collect rice from the temple, the snake let her go but then went looking for her, only to be struck dead by lightning. The princess then buried him at the temple.

Food

The city was historically known as a chicken farming region, and is famous for "dak galbi", which translates as chicken ribs. It consists of chicken, sliced cabbage, sweet potatoes, tteok (rice cakes), and scallions, mixed with a spicy sauce heavy on gochujang. It is usually cooked in a big iron pan in the center of the table, but the original method is over charcoal. Despite the name, the dish is traditionally made from leg meat, not ribs. There is even a street in the city dedicated to restaurants serving the dish, with some 25 restaurants populating the area.

Also, Makguksu noodle is famous among the nation.

Tourism

Festivities

Cultural festival
Gim Yujeong munhakje is a literature festival that takes place in April every year in memorial of the novelist Gim Yujeong. Uiam jae is another festival in April in which people worship Nongae who sacrificed herself for the country. In May, the Chuncheon International Mime Festival gathers troupes from places including Denmark, Taiwan, Germany etc., to give theatre and dance performance. Chuncheon art festival in July provides performers with opportunities to show off their talents and skills. Chuncheon International Early Music Festival also takes place in July with a wide range of classical Music of Korea. Chuncheon Puppet Festival showcases traditional puppet shows every August while traditional theatre plays are performed on Chuncheon International Theatre Festival in September Chuncheon International AniTown Festival in September is a free event that enables participants to learn more about animation production.

Local festivals
In August, visitors can enjoy traditional Chuncheon cuisines like Dak-galbi (spicy stir-fried chicken) and Mak-guksu (buckwheat noodles) during the Chuncheon Dakgalbi & Makguksu Festival. The Soyang festival, which takes place in September, promotes the cultural history of the Soyang Dam.

Leisure sports festival
There are three marathons in Chuncheon every year. The National inlineskate Chuncheon Marathon takes place in April while The Chosun Ilbo Chuncheon Marathon and the Lakeside Chuncheon Marathon Festival are both held in October. People participates in Chuncheon Open International Taekwondo Championships in June to compete for championship in the Korean martial arts Taekwondo. Gangchon national MTB Challenge Competition September is a mountain bike racing festival.

Economy
Chuncheon is the market center for agricultural produce from the surrounding area. The main products are rice and soybeans. Since the 1960s light industry has become dominant in the city. After the huge success of the TV drama Winter Sonata, the city has also become a major "Korean Wave" (Han-ryu) tourist destination, attracting visitors from around East Asia.

Legoland Korea is also under construction in Chuncheon. The first Legoland in Northeast Asia, it will be built in a 1.29 square kilometer parcel of land in Jungdo island and is expected to draw over a million tourists when it opens.  It will be the largest Legoland in the world.

There are hydroelectric powerplants in the area around Chuncheon. The Soyang Dam is the largest sand gravel dam in East Asia.

Population
Per Korean census data, Chuncheon's population has grown steadily over the past half century.

Education
National Universities
Kangwon National University
Chuncheon National University of Education
Korea National Open University Gangwon Campus
Korea Polytechnic 3 University
Private Universities
Hallym University
Hallym Sungsim University
Songgok College

Transportation

As of June 2014, there are two train stations in the Chuncheon suburban area: the terminus of the Gyeongchun Line, Chuncheon station, and the busier Namchuncheon station. Gimyujeong, Baegyang-ri, Gulbongsan, and Gangchon stations, all located in rural Chuncheon, attract tourists. Gangchon is one of the most favorite recreational destinations for university students. The Gyeongchun Line is a double track rapid transit commuter train that connects to Yongsan, Cheongnyangni and Sangbong stations in Seoul. On 21 December 2010, a new realignment of the Gyeongchun Line was opened, and several new or transferable stations have since been opened to replace the existing stations outside Chuncheon, such as Cheonmasan, Sinnae, and Byeollae.

There is the Gyeongchun Line subway in Chuncheon. If you use the Gyeongchun Line, you can get to Chuncheon in an hour and a half from Seoul.

Chuncheon is the northern terminus of the publicly funded Jungang Expressway, and the main destination of the privately run Seoul-Chuncheon Expressway, as also known as Gyeongchun Expressway that connects to Seoul and Hongcheon-east. As of 2017, the expressway has been extended to east coast city of Yangyang, thus renamed to Seoul-Yangyang Expressway. Chuncheon Bus Terminal connects to all major cities in mainland South Korea.

On National roads-wise, Chuncheon is also the main strategic destination that connects between Changwon to Cheolwon of Route (Number) 5, Incheon to Goseong of 46, and Cheolwon to Yangyang of 56.

There are also river transport facilities in Soyangho (Lake Soyang), which connects to Cheongpyeongsa (청평사, Buddhist) temple.

Climate
Chuncheon has a monsoon-influenced humid continental climate (Köppen: Dwa) with cold, dry winters and hot, rainy summers. The annual precipitation is an average of 1347.3 mm.

Sports

International competitions
High1 (Korean: 하이원) is an ice hockey team based in Chuncheon. The club was a member of the Asia League Ice Hockey between 2005 and 2019.

Domestic competitions
Chuncheon's association football club, Chuncheon FC, is a member of the K4 League, a semi-professional football competition and the fourth tier of the South Korean football league system. The club was founded on 27 February 2010 with its home at the Chuncheon Stadium.

Notable people
 Son Heung-Min (Hangul: 손흥민), South Korean professional footballer
 Hwang Hee-chan (Hangul: 황희찬), South Korean professional footballer
 Hur Jae (Hangul: 허재), South Korean basketball coach and former basketball player
 Kim Jun-hyun (Hangul: 김준현), South Korean comedian
 Park Bo-ram (Hangul: 박보람), South Korean singer-songwriter
 Seunghee (Real Name: Hyun Seung-hee, Hangul: 현승희), singer, dancer, actress and K-pop idol, member of K-pop girl group Oh My Girl
 Yebin (Real Name: Baek Ye-bin, Hangul: 백예빈), singer-songwriter, dancer, composer and K-pop idol, former member of K-pop girl groups DIA and Uni.T.

 Changjo (Real Name: Choi Jong-hyun, Hangul: 최종현), singer-songwriter, rapper, dancer, model, actor and K-pop idol, member of K-pop boy group Teen Top
Gim Yu-jeong (Hangul: 김유정), one of the famous novelists of Korea
Jin Jong-oh (Hangul: 진종오), a South Korean sports shooter who competed at the 2004, 2008, 2012 and 2016 Summer Olympics
HAN Seung-Soo (Hangul:  한승수), the 39th prime minister of Rep. of Korea, tenure 2008-2009

Sister cities

Chuncheon-si protested against the enactment of "Day of Takeshima" ordinance of Shimane Prefecture , which expressed dispute over the Dokdo Islands, and announced suspension of its sisterhood relationship with Kakamigahara in March 2005.

See also
 List of cities in South Korea

References

External links

 
 Official Homepage of Chuncheon City 

 

 
Cities in Gangwon Province, South Korea